FTSE may refer to: 

 FTSE Group, a British provider of stock market indices
 FTSE 100 Index and other stock market indices:
 FTSE/Athex Large Cap (symbol: FTSE) on the Athens Stock Exchange 
 Fundamental theorem of software engineering
Fellow of the Australian Academy of Technological Sciences and Engineering